Man Against Crime (also known as Follow That Man) starring Ralph Bellamy, one of the first television programs about private eyes, ran on CBS, the DuMont Television Network and NBC from October 7, 1949, to June 27, 1954, and was briefly revived, starring Frank Lovejoy, during 1956. The show was created by Lawrence Klee and was broadcast live until 1952. The series was one of the few television programs ever to have been simulcast on more than one network: the program aired on both NBC and DuMont during the 1953–54 television season.

Synopsis
Man Against Crime stars Ralph Bellamy as Mike Barnett, a New York freelance private eye. In the 1951 season, Robert Preston co-starred as Mike Barnett's brother, Pat (who also assumed the lead while Bellamy was on vacation that summer). Mike Barnett did not carry a gun.

Accompanied by a frantic theme song by Fred Steiner [where is the evidence that Steiner wrote the theme? - the theme is named "Manhunt" and originally was in the Filmusic Library, then the Langlois Filmusic Library, then Cinemusic Library, and now in the APM Music Library - it can be found online at www.APMmusic.com and on YouTube], the film noir-style introduction features an unknown man running down a deserted New York City street while being chased by a black car, all of which is viewed from above. As he knocks on Barnett's door, there is a spray of sub-machine gun fire, and the man is killed. Barnett opens the door, hears the click of the bolt on the gun, ducks and is missed by a second, shorter burst of slugs.  Barnett then takes off after the killer while Follow That Man appears in bold letters and the title of the episode is shown on a file folder that is propped up against a telephone. The filmed episodes were syndicated as Follow That Man because the sponsor owned the original title [see below].

The show's first prime-time episode aired on CBS on  October 7, 1949, and the final prime-time episode was broadcast, on NBC, on August 26, 1956. In the 1950–51 season, the series finished at #13 in the Nielsen ratings, followed by a #29 finish in 1951–52.

1956 version
Man Against Crime returned to TV on NBC from July 1, 1956, through August 19, 1956, at 10 p.m. Eastern Time as a summer replacement for The Loretta Young Show. Procter & Gamble sponsored this version, which starred Frank Lovejoy and originated in Hollywood, California. It was televised live.

Production
The program was initially broadcast live from CBS's studio in the Grand Central Terminal building, but by mid-1953, it was being filmed at the Bedford Park Studios in New York City, while exterior sites included the East River, Grant's Tomb, the Hudson River, the Staten Island Ferry, and subways. The budget was $10,000 - $15,000 per episode for the initial live broadcasts, but expenses increased with the shift to film.

Charles Russell was the producer, Paul Nickell was the director, and Lawrence Klee was the writer. The program originated from WCBS-TV. Philip Reisman Jr. was the script editor.

Sponsorship and scheduling
Camel cigarettes sponsored the series. That sponsorship produced limitations for writers that included "no disreputable person could smoke, nor could anyone smoke nervously or in any unattractive manner. No coughing (implying cigarettes could cause disease) or arson (suggesting cigarettes could cause fires) was allowed."

In October 1953, Man Against Crime moved to NBC, but that network was unable to clear time for the program in approximately 10 cities, including New York City. DuMont had no program scheduled for the show's Sunday night time slot, so it carried Man Against Crime in those cities. By then, WOR-TV in New York City was broadcasting reruns of earlier episodes of the show on Saturday nights.

Episodes

Season 1 (1949–50)

Season 2 (1950)

Season 3 (1951)

Season 4 (1952–53)

Season 5 (1953–54)

See also 

List of programs broadcast by the DuMont Television Network
List of surviving DuMont Television Network broadcasts

References

Bibliography
David Weinstein, The Forgotten Network: DuMont and the Birth of American Television (Philadelphia: Temple University Press, 2004) 
Alex McNeil, Total Television, Fourth edition (New York: Penguin Books, 1980) 
Tim Brooks and Earle Marsh, The Complete Directory to Prime Time Network TV Shows, Third edition (New York: Ballantine Books, 1964)

External links

  — 1949 – 1954 series
  — 1956 series
 DuMont historical website

1949 American television series debuts
1954 American television series endings
1956 American television series debuts
1956 American television series endings
1940s American crime drama television series
1950s American crime drama television series
Black-and-white American television shows
CBS original programming
DuMont Television Network original programming
NBC original programming
Television shows set in New York City
Television shows filmed in New York City
American detective television series